Jaklin Alawi (born 28 December 1990) is a former professional tennis player from Bulgaria.

Biography
A right-handed player from Sofia, Alawi competed on the professional ITF circuit while a junior, from 2005 to 2008.

Alawi featured in two ties for the Bulgaria Fed Cup team, against Great Britain and Poland in 2007, both times partnering Dessislava Mladenova.

In 2009 she left the tour to play and attend college in the United States, first at Long Beach State, then the University of South Carolina.

While in South Carolina, Alawi and her college teammate Dominika Kaňáková received a wildcard to compete in the doubles at the 2013 Family Circle Cup, which was her only WTA Tour main draw appearance.

ITF Circuit finals

Singles: 1 (1 runner–up)

Fed Cup
Jaklin Alawi debuted for the Bulgaria Fed Cup team in 2017. Since then, she has a 0–0 singles record and a 0–2 doubles record (0–2 overall).

Doubles (0–2)

 RR = Round Robin

References

External links
 
 
 

1990 births
Living people
Bulgarian female tennis players
South Carolina Gamecocks women's tennis players
Long Beach State Beach women's tennis players
Sportspeople from Sofia